Dragan Vulević (Serbian Cyrillic: Драган Вулевић; born 13 December 1970) is a Serbian former professional footballer who played as a forward.

During his journeyman career, Vulević represented Mladost Lučani, Red Star Belgrade, Vojvodina, Albacete, Panionios, Borac Čačak, Radnički Obrenovac, Sevojno, Novi Pazar, Sloga Bajina Bašta, and FAP.

Honours
Red Star Belgrade
 FR Yugoslavia Cup: 1996–97

References

External links
 

Albacete Balompié players
Association football forwards
Expatriate footballers in Greece
Expatriate footballers in Spain
First League of Serbia and Montenegro players
FK Borac Čačak players
FK FAP players
FK Mladost Lučani players
FK Novi Pazar players
FK Radnički Obrenovac players
FK Sevojno players
FK Vojvodina players
Panionios F.C. players
People from Prijepolje
Red Star Belgrade footballers
Segunda División players
Serbia and Montenegro expatriate footballers
Serbia and Montenegro footballers
Serbia and Montenegro expatriate sportspeople in Greece
Serbia and Montenegro expatriate sportspeople in Spain
Serbian First League players
Serbian footballers
Super League Greece players
1970 births
Living people